Acinopus ammophilus is a species of ground beetle in the subfamily Harpalinae and the only species in the subgenus Acinopus (Osimus).

References

Harpalinae
Beetles described in 1829